USS Kenmore (AP-162/AK-221)  was a  built during World War II for the US Navy. Kenmore was named after George Washington's sister Betty's house Kenmore. Kenmore was responsible for delivering troops, goods and equipment to locations in the Asiatic-Pacific Theater.

Construction
Kenmore was laid down 8 May 1943, under a Maritime Commission (MARCOM) contract, MC hull No. 1664, as the Liberty ship SS James H. McClintock, by California Shipbuilding Corporation, Terminal Island, Los Angeles, California; launched on 30 May 1943; sponsored by Mrs. T. J. Bluechel; renamed Kenmore 27 October 1943; acquired by the Navy and commissioned 14 November 1943.

Service history

1943–1944
Kenmore loaded cargo and departed Oakland, California, 22 November 1943, arriving Pearl Harbor on 1 December. After repairs at Pearl Harbor, she prepared for the Marshall Islands invasion and departed Hawaii 25 January 1944. Nine days later she arrived off the shores of Majuro Atoll with troops and equipment of the attacking force. The cargo ship returned to Pearl Harbor 21 February, to embark garrison troops for the Gilbert Islands, debarking them at Tarawa in March.
 
After shuttling troops between the Gilberts and Hawaii for the next two months, Kenmore departed Honolulu 29 May, for Kwajalein, the staging area for the invasion of the Marianas. There she loaded troops of the 106th Infantry and arrived with the massive amphibious force in the assault area off Saipan 20 June. After a beachhead was secured, Kenmore remained in the area until 8 July, unloading cargo and equipment. Throughout the summer she transported troops among the Marshalls, Marianas, and Hawaii.
 
Reclassified AK-221 on 20 August, Kenmore stood out of Honolulu 25 September, with cargo and reinforcements for the Palau Islands via Eniwetok, arriving Kossal Roads 29 October. She continued supplying the Pacific Islands with men and equipment for the next six months.

1945–1946
The cargo ship departed Ulithi 20 April 1945 with reinforcements needed for the Okinawa campaign, arriving there six days later.

In the closing days of the war, Kenmore shuttled troops between California and the Pacific Islands, insuring the already inevitable victory. When hostilities ended 15 August, Kenmore was assigned to Operation "Magic Carpet" duty. She made two cruises between the Islands, China, and San Francisco arriving with her final group 15 December.

Post-war decommissioning
Kenmore remained in San Francisco, and decommissioned there 1 February 1946. She was delivered to the War Shipping Administration the same day for return to her owner. Her name reverted to James H. McClintock.

Fate
She was placed in the National Defense Reserve Fleet, Suisun Bay Group, until purchased by Chi Shun Hua Steel Company, Ltd., on 13 February 1973, for $185,150. She was physically removed from the Reserve Fleet on 26 March 1973.

Awards
Kenmore received two battle stars for World War II service.

Notes 

Citations

Bibliography 

Online resources

External links
 

Crater-class cargo ships
World War II auxiliary ships of the United States
Transports of the United States Navy
Ships built in Los Angeles
1943 ships
Suisun Bay Reserve Fleet